2009 Hong Kong Broadcasting Authority forum was a public forum held on the night of July 14, 2009 by the Hong Kong Broadcasting Authority.  The forum gave the citizens a chance to provide feedback and comments about the two free Hong Kong TV station TVB and ATV.  A large number of questions and complaints were directed at the station representatives.  Starting from issues of self-censorship, the forum soon escalated to chaos including heated comments toward TVB general manager Stephen Chan Chi Wan.

Background
Both ATV and TVB's current broadcast license went into effect on 1 December 2003.  Traditionally TVB news used the slogan (無綫新聞，事事關心), which means "TVB News, care about events".   In June 2009 people became dissatisfied with how the 1989 Tiananmen Square protests were being reported locally.  Thus the phrase (無綫新聞，事事旦旦) became a new protest spinoff phrase.  On June 5, a day after the Tiananmen square 20th anniversary, all the TV stations were analyzed for their handling of the Tiananmen broadcast.  TVB, which has the largest viewership and largely regarded as a monopoly, broadcast only 8 minutes of the event well after a number of lesser important programs.  Some of the programs that came before Tiananmen news included students abusing drugs in Tin Shui Wai, and lesser important news regarding Legco and the Hong Kong subway.  This led TVB to be labeled as CCTVB by the critics, which is a knockoff of the People's Republic of China's censored state-run station CCTV.

Forum
On July 14, 2009 the forum had about 350 participants.  The forum originally began with the complaints of self-censorship being practiced by both stations along with other broadcast freedom issues.  The questions later spiraled to issues of monopoly, controlling of celebrities etc. Each citizen had 3 minutes to ask questions.

Some top questions directed toward Stephen Chan:

 Does TVB ask actors and actresses to participate on some shows in exchange for awards.
 Why was Twins Gillian Chung's special TVB pay-vision response interview broadcast first, as opposed to the Tiananmen incident which was broadcast third.
 Is the phrase "Puk gai" (僕街) considered a real profanity?  Why is it ok when TV series actors use it, but beeped out when politicians use it on news programs.
 Other earlier complaints include the downplaying of Jackie Chan's Chinese people need to be controlled comment.

See also
 Censorship in Hong Kong
 Censorship in the People's Republic of China

References

Hong Kong Broadcasting Authority Forum, 2009